Mark Robert Arcobello (born August 12, 1988) is an American professional ice hockey right winger who currently serves as captain of HC Lugano of the National League (NL).

Playing career

Junior career
As a youth, Arcobello played in the 2002 Quebec International Pee-Wee Hockey Tournament with the New York Rangers minor ice hockey team. Arcobello played for Salisbury School, graduating in 2006, then played four years of college hockey at Yale University with the Yale Bulldogs men's ice hockey team. Undrafted after college, Arcobello played the 2010–11 season in minor league professional hockey with two affiliates of the Edmonton Oilers, the Stockton Thunder and the Oklahoma City Barons.  The Oilers signed Arcobello to a two-year entry-level contract on April 1, 2011.

NHL career
Arcobello played his first National Hockey League (NHL) game during the 2012–13 NHL season, when he played a single game on February 5, 2013, following an injury to Oilers' captain Shawn Horcoff. On June 16, 2013, Arcobello signed a one-year contract extension with the Oilers.

During the 2014–15 season, on December 29, 2014, the Oilers traded Arcobello to the Nashville Predators in exchange for Derek Roy. Arcobello scored in his Predators debut against the Los Angeles Kings on January 3. However, after four games, Nashville placed him on waivers. The injury-depleted Pittsburgh Penguins claimed him on January 14, 2015. After 10 games, the Penguins placed him on waivers. The Arizona Coyotes claimed him on February 11, becoming his fourth NHL team of the season. Arcobello is the third player in NHL history, following Dennis O'Brien and Dave McLlwain, to play on four teams in a single season.

As the Coyotes did not tender Arcobello a qualifying offer, he became a free agent. On July 1, 2015, he joined his fifth team in under a year upon signing a one-year contract with the Toronto Maple Leafs. Arcabello joined the Maple Leafs for the first few games of the 2015–16 season, but after failing to record any points, he cleared waivers and was assigned to their minor league affiliate, the Toronto Marlies. He was called up to the injury-depleted Leafs in February 2016, scoring two goals in his first game back.

European career
Upon the conclusion of the 2015–16 season, he opted to continue his career overseas, putting pen to paper on a two-year deal with SC Bern of the National League (NL) in Switzerland. Arcobello made his NL debut on September 9, 2016 in the Berner derby against the SCL Tigers. He scored his first goal that same day after only 44 seconds into the first period. He then went on to add three assists in this game before 17,031 spectators in a packed PostFinance Arena. Arcobello finished the 2016–17 regular season as the league PostFinance Top Scorer with 25 goals and 30 assists in 50 regular season games, while winning NL regular season MVP honors. He then led Bern to the 2017 NL title as the league's top scorer, tallying 20 points in 16 postseason contests. On May 9, 2017, with one year remaining on his contract, he agreed to a two-year contract extension with the Bears until the end of the 2019–20 season. In the following 2018–19 season, Arcobello won his second NL title with Bern.

In 2018, the NHL withdrew their contracted players from appearing at the 2018 Winter Olympics. Team USA sought out players from outside the NHL instead and Arcobello was among those chosen. Arcobello registered two points in five games as Team USA finished seventh overall in the tournament.

On October 10, 2019, Arcobello agreed to a three-year contract with HC Lugano worth CHF3 million, extending from the 2020–21 season through the 2022–23 season. On August 26, 2021, Arcobello was named captain of HC Lugano.

Career statistics

Regular season and playoffs

International

Awards and honors

References

External links

1988 births
Living people
American people of Italian descent
AHCA Division I men's ice hockey All-Americans
American expatriate ice hockey players in Canada
American expatriate sportspeople in Switzerland
American men's ice hockey right wingers
Arizona Coyotes players
Edmonton Oilers players
Ice hockey players from Connecticut
Ice hockey players at the 2018 Winter Olympics
HC Lugano players
Nashville Predators players
Oklahoma City Barons players
Olympic ice hockey players of the United States
People from Milford, Connecticut
Pittsburgh Penguins players
SC Bern players
Stockton Thunder players
Toronto Maple Leafs players
Toronto Marlies players
Undrafted National Hockey League players
Yale Bulldogs men's ice hockey players
Fairfield College Preparatory School alumni